

Bibliography of writings by Chambers

Translations

 Bambi (1928):  Bambi. Eine Lebensgeschichte aus dem Walde by Felix Salten. Published by Ullstein Verlag, Austria in 1923. Translated by Whittaker Chambers as Bambi, A Life in the Woods.  Published by Simon & Schuster, New York in 1928.
 Complete list of translations 1928-1940

Books and plays
For the best known work written by Chambers, see separate entry Witness (memoir)

 (includes a Commonweal article by Whittaker Chambers)

Online

Collections

Magazine or journal articles

New Masses
 "Can You Make Out Their Voices" (March 1931)
 "You Have Seen the Heads" (April 1931)
 "Our Comrade Munn" (October 1931))
 "The Death of the Communists" (December 1931)

Time
 "The Ghosts on the Roof" (1945)
 "Books: Problem of the Century" (1946)
 "Religion:  In Egypt Land" (1946) 
 "Education:  The Challenge" (1947)
 "Books:  Circles of Perdition" (1947) 
 "Religion:  Faith for a Lenten Age" (1948)

Life

 1947–1948: 
 "The Middle Ages" (April 7, 1947)
 "Medieval Life" (May 26, 1947)
 "The Glory of Venice" (August 4, 1947)
 "The Age of Enlightenment" (September 15, 1947)
 "The Edwardians" (November 17, 1947)
 "Age of Exploration" (March 22, 1948)
 "The Protestant Revolution" (June 14, 1948)
 "The Devil Throughout History," (February 2, 1948)
 "Is Academic Freedom in Danger?" (June 22, 1953)
 "The End of a Dark Age Ushers in New Dangers" (April 30, 1956)

Commonweal

 "The Sanctity of St. Benedict" (September 19, 1952)

National Review

 "Big Sister Is Watching You" (December 27, 1957)
 "all National Review articles 1957–1959

Collected magazine articles

Other media

Video on Chambers

 
 YouTube.com Red Spy Films. Chambers Farm, Secret Doc. 1948/12/06 (1948) time:  00:00:51
 RAM Whittaker Chambers on "close friends"
 RAM Alger Hiss Story - Chambers on the "tragedy of history"
 RAM Alger Hiss defends himself
 Historical Footage

Photos

 1931 Whittaker Chambers
 1939 Whittaker Chambers
 1948 Whittaker Chambers before HUAC
 1950 Whittaker Chambers reading of Hiss guilty verdict
 1961 Whittaker Chambers near the time of his death

Hiss–Chambers case

Books on Hiss case

Articles on Hiss case
 "Deception and Betrayal:  The Tragedy of Alger Hiss" by Donald Hermann (2005)

Film on Hiss case
 Nixon, 1995, directed by Oliver Stone, (IMDB) - video clips of Whittaker Chambers
 Concealed Enemies, 1984, directed by Jeff Bleckner, (IMDB) - made-for-television movie on the Hiss-Chambers case (pro-Hiss)
 The Trials of Alger Hiss, 1980, (IMDB) - pro-Hiss film (see also The New York Times)
 North by Northwest, 1959, directed by Alfred Hitchcock (IMDB) - reference to the Pumpkin Papers
 Commotion on the Ocean, 1959, Three Stooges (IMDB) - features microfilm in watermelon in reference to the Pumpkin Papers

Articles or chapters on Chambers

Chambers and Soviet espionage

Novels that include characters based on Chambers

References

External links

 Authors Guild

See also
 Witness (memoir)

Chambers